Bruno Broucqsault (born 15 January 1973) is a French equestrian. He competed in two events at the 2004 Summer Olympics. In April 2004 in Milan, he won the Show Jumping World Cup on the horse Dileme de Cephe.

References

1973 births
Living people
French male equestrians
Olympic equestrians of France
Equestrians at the 2004 Summer Olympics
Place of birth missing (living people)